"Get on Your Feet" is a song by Cuban-American singer and songwriter Gloria Estefan. It was released on September 30, 1989 by Epic Records in the US, Japan, and the UK, and in 1990 in Europe as the second single from her debut solo album, Cuts Both Ways (1989). The song was written by John DeFaria, Jorge Casas and Clay Ostwald, and produced by Emilio Estefan, Jr., Casas and Ostwald. A rerecorded version was included on her 2020 album Brazil305.

Critical reception
AllMusic editor Jason Birchmeier said the song is "club-ready" with its "big late-'80s synth-drum patterns", declaring it as a "super" song. Maryann Scheufele from AXS wrote, "The words, "get up and make it happen...stand up and take some action ..." is a song for the ages, ...and the song inspires the spirit that lives on when you do something about your life. Gloria Estefan convinces you that the weight of inaction is lifted off your shoulders when you "get on your feet". Gloria Estefan sings and Miami Sound Machine plays we all can dance our way through life to this one." Bill Coleman from Billboard called it "an unassuming up-tempo pop/dance track harking back to the singer's "Conga" days." A reviewer from Entertainment Weekly noted that the song has "surge and hustle". Pan-European magazine Music & Media called it "another lightweight up-tempo tune. As Latin as ever and a guaranteed hit." Pop Rescue opined that the track "ups the tempo somewhat, as the title suggests, with a plodding bass and beat, with acoustic guitars strumming. Gloria bursts in with her confident pop vocals. The song is up-lifting, telling you to ‘Get on your feet. get up and make it happen‘ and ‘Stand up and take some action‘."

Official versions
Original Versions
 Album Version — (3:38)
 2020 version (on Brazil305) – 3:25

John Haag Remixes
 Special Mix — (5:38)

Justin Strauss & Daniel Abraham Remixes
 Pop Vocal — (6:07)
 House Vocal — (6:50)
 House Techno Dub — (5:30)
 Deep Bass Vocal — (5:29)

Charts

Usage in media
In a widely circulated viral video "Steve Ballmer Going Crazy", former Microsoft CEO Steve Ballmer danced and screamed wildly to this song at the company's 25th anniversary event in 2000.

The song was covered by Fantasia Barrino on the third season of American Idol, during a Gloria Estefan-themed episode.

The song was included in several episodes in the fourth season of the NBC comedy Parks and Recreation.

Track listings

Release history

References

External links

1989 singles
1990 singles
Gloria Estefan songs
1989 songs
Dance-pop songs
Synth-pop songs
Epic Records singles
Song recordings produced by Emilio Estefan